El Orinoco ilustrado y defendido (The Orinoco illustrated and defended), is a book written by the Jesuit missionary Joseph Gumilla. He explored the Orinoco River basin in the eighteenth century. The book provides details on the tributaries of the Orinoco River from Venezuela, as well as customs of the indigenous people, medicines, food, etc.

External links 
Jose Gumilla Biography on page´s Gumilla Center.
Google Books

Venezuelan literature
Jesuit publications
Books about Venezuela